General elections were held in the Cook Islands on 30 March 1983. The result was a victory for the Cook Islands Party (CIP) of Geoffrey Henry, who became Prime Minister. However, the CIP lost their majority by the end of July, eventually resulting in Parliament being dissolved and new elections called in November 1983.

Electoral system
Previously the Legislative Assembly had 22 members elected from 12 constituencies of between one and four seats in size. Following constitutional reforms, the Assembly was renamed Parliament and the number of members was increased to 24, with the country split into 23 single-member constituencies and an additional constituency for overseas voters.

Campaign
Campaigning was much milder than in the 1978 elections, with the government – now controlled by the Democratic Party – having introduced limits on radio airtime and newspaper advertising by parties.

Results
Prime Minister Thomas Davis and Minister Iaveta Short both lost their seats.

Aftermath
Following the elections, Henry appointed a seven-member cabinet, including the first female minister, Fanaura Kingstone. Kingstone had been elected from the overseas constituency with the intention of resigning in protest at the creation of the constituency. However, she later changed her mind as the CIP failed to win a significant majority.

Shortly after the elections, the Democratic Party MP for Atiu lost their seat after a successful petition against the result in the constituency, increasing the CIP majority to three. A court case also began as Henry had failed to resign from office within the first seven days of the parliamentary session and seek re-appointment, as required by the constitution. This was initially viewed as a technicality due to the CIP majority in Parliament. However, in July CIP MP Matapo Matapo died and Tupui Henry left the CIP to sit with the Democratic Party, leaving an 11–11 tie. The final verdict of the Court of Appeal was announced on 29 July, requiring Henry to resign.

Without a majority, Henry resigned on 2 August. Queen's Representative Gaven Donne convened a series of votes to determine who could attain a parliamentary majority, with the vote on 10 August ending as 11 each for Geoffrey and Tupui Henry. With the Atiu by-election – almost certain to be won by the Democratic Party – due on 12 August, Donne asked the two leaders to wait until the by-election for Matapo's seat before a government was appointed. Tupui Henry and Leader of the Opposition Vincent Ingram agreed in the belief that they could win Matapo's former constituency. However, Geoffrey Henry declined. This resulted in Donne dissolving Parliament on 17 August, calling fresh elections for November, and appointing Geoffrey Henry as caretaker Prime Minister with restricted powers.

References

External links
In reference by Queens Representative (1983) CKHC 18; HC OA 1.1983 - one of the cases which led to parliament being dissolved.

1983 03
Cook
1983 in the Cook Islands
Cook
1983 Cook